Lutz Caspers (born 10 July 1943) is a German athlete. He competed in the men's hammer throw at the 1968 Summer Olympics.

References

External links
 

1943 births
Living people
Athletes (track and field) at the 1968 Summer Olympics
German male hammer throwers
Olympic athletes of West Germany
People from Winterberg
Sportspeople from Arnsberg (region)